S. Aravind Ramesh is an Indian politician and a Member of the Legislative Assembly of Tamil Nadu. He was elected to the Tamil Nadu legislative assembly from  Sholinganallur as a Dravida Munnetra Kazhagam (DMK) candidate in 2016.

Electoral performance

References 

Tamil Nadu politicians
Living people
Year of birth missing (living people)
Tamil Nadu MLAs 2016–2021
Tamil Nadu municipal councillors
Tamil Nadu MLAs 2021–2026
Dravida Munnetra Kazhagam politicians